The 2004 Wilkes-Barre/Scranton Pioneers season was the team's third season as a member of the AF2.  The Pioneers finished with a 13–3 record under new head coach Les Moss, their fourth head coach in three seasons.  The Pioneers clinched the Northeastern Division and secured their best first playoff appearance.  The Pioneers lost in the third week of the postseason, ending their playoff run just short of the ArenaCup.  Following the season, Moss signed a contract to remain the head coach for a second season, the first returning coach in team history.

Schedule

Regular season

Postseason

Final standings

Attendance

References

External links
ArenaFan Online 2004 Wilkes-Barre/Pioneers schedule
ArenaFan Online 2004 af2 standings
ArenaFan Online 2004 af2 attendance

Wilkes-Barre/Scranton Pioneers seasons
2004 in American football
Wilkes-Barre Scranton Pioneers